Chad Owens Sr. (born April 3, 1982) is a former professional Canadian football wide receiver and kick returner. He was most recently a member of the Hamilton Tiger-Cats of the Canadian Football League (CFL). He was drafted by the Jacksonville Jaguars in the sixth round of the 2005 NFL Draft. Owens played college football at Hawaii. He spent six seasons playing for the Toronto Argonauts, and has also been a member of the Montreal Alouettes and Saskatchewan Roughriders.

Early years
Owens attended Roosevelt High School in Honolulu, Hawaii, and he was a three-sport letter-winner and star in football, basketball, and Track. In football, as a senior, he was an all—OIA white division selection, and an All-State honourable mention. As a sophomore, he garnered first-team All-OIA Red Division honours, and All-State honourable-mention accolades. He was also a basketball star and as a senior, he led his team to the OIA state basketball championship. He has three children: Chad Jr., Areana, and Sierra-Lynn with his wife, Rena Owens. They’ve been together for 25 years, married for 15 years.

College career
Owens became a bigger star after joining the University of Hawaii football team as a wide receiver, punt returner and kick returner. He became the featured receiver in June Jones's Run & Shoot Offence, and became the number one receiver for quarterback Timmy Chang. Owens was instrumental on the Warriors teams that won both the Hawaii Bowl in 2003 and 2004 by beating the University of Houston and the University of Alabama at Birmingham.
 Hawaii's All-time Career Yardage Leader With 5,461 All-purpose Yards
 Gained 3,031 receiving yards (6th in school history) and 29 touchdowns (5th) in 44 games, 
 Awarded the Mosi Tatupu Award for best Special Teams Player in 2004

College statistics

Professional career

Jacksonville Jaguars
Owens was cut by the Jacksonville Jaguars after his NFL debut against the Indianapolis Colts where he muffed three punts. He was re-signed to the Jaguars' practice squad a few days later.

Playing with the Jaguars in his first pre-season game of the 2006 season, Owens caught a 62-yard pass and scored his first NFL touchdown.

Colorado Crush
Owens signed with agent Richard "Bruno" Burnoski and signed a contract with the Colorado Crush of the Arena Football League. Owens got off to a fast start with the Crush, generating over 1600 combined yards (receiving and returns) but tore his ACL, ending his season after nine games.

Montreal Alouettes
On July 14, 2009, Owens signed a practice roster agreement with the Montreal Alouettes. He was released on October 1. He was re-signed to the practice roster on October 8 and was considered a part of the 97th Grey Cup Championship team for participating in a game during the regular season.

Toronto Argonauts
On June 24, 2010, the Toronto Argonauts acquired Owens from the Alouettes in exchange for a fourth-round pick in the 2011 CFL Draft.

On November 25, 2010, Owens was named the most outstanding special teams player in the Canadian Football League for the 2010 season. Owens was a unanimous selection after leading the CFL in punt, kickoff, missed field goal returns and all-purpose yards and finishing tied for the league lead in return touchdowns (four). He became just the fifth player in league history to have over 1,000 punt and kick return yards in a season.

On November 1, 2012, in the final regular-season game against the Hamilton Tiger-Cats, Owens set the all-time record for all-purpose yards in a single season, surpassing Pinball Clemons' 1997 total of 3,840 yards. Owens did so with a 29-yard kickoff return halfway through the 2nd quarter.  He finished the season with 3863 all-purpose yards, setting not only a CFL record, but also a professional football record as well. In his third full season in Toronto, Owens became the first player in professional football to record at least 3,000 combined yards in back-to-back seasons.

On November 22, 2012, Owens won the CFL Most Outstanding Player Award finishing ahead of Calgary Stampeders running back Jon Cornish in voting conducted by the Football Reporters of Canada as well as the eight CFL head coaches. On November 25, 2012, Owens and the Argonauts finished the 2012 season with the 100th Grey Cup Championship. Owens was rated the best player in the league on the TSN Top 50 players of 2012.

On June 8, 2013, the Argos and Owens agreed to a two-year contract extension. The deal was rumoured to make Owens the highest-paid non-quarterback in the CFL. The Argonauts did not re-sign Owens at the conclusion of the 2015 CFL season, rendering Owens a free agent.

Hamilton Tiger-Cats
On February 11, 2016, Owens agreed to a one-year contract with the Hamilton Tiger-Cats as a free agent. Subsequently, it was announced on October 4, after playing 12 games with the Tiger-Cats, that Owens would miss the remainder of the 2016 CFL season due to a broken foot he sustained in a game against the Montreal Alouettes. He would subsequently re-enter Free Agency after only a season with the organization.

Saskatchewan Roughriders
On February 15, 2017, Owens agreed to a two-year deal with the Saskatchewan Roughriders. It was announced, on June 21, 2017, that Owens was placed on the six-game injured list due to an apparent foot injury he likely sustained while with the Tiger-Cats.

Owens made his Roughriders debut on October 20, 2017 in a winning effort against the Calgary Stampeders recording five receptions with seventy eight yards. Despite his strong performance at the end of the 2017 Saskatchewan Roughriders campaign, he was part of final roster cuts for the Riders on June 9, 2018. His age and performance relative to younger players are believed to be contributing factors affecting the decision to cut ties with the player.

Hamilton Tiger-Cats (II) 
Owens returned to the Hamilton Tiger-Cats when he signed a practice roster deal on September 11, 2018. He was released on October 1, 2018 without having played in a game.

Career statistics

NFL stats

AFL stats

CFL stats

MMA career
In the off-season following the 2012 CFL season, Owens decided to pursue MMA as a form of off-season training. Then Argos GM Jim Barker openly expressed his displeasure with Owens's fighting in MMA, and was quoted as saying, "I think he's making a bad decision, our organization thinks he's making a bad decision". On April 6, 2013, Owens defeated Junya Tevaga by unanimous decision in an amateur bout. The organization that oversaw the fight was Destiny MMA.

Personal life
In January 2015, Owens moved from Hawaii to Canada full-time; but has now relocated back to his home of Oahu (Honolulu),Hawai'i

See also
 List of Canadian Football League records (individual)
 List of NCAA major college football yearly receiving leaders

References

External links
Toronto Argonauts profile page 
NFL profile
ArenaFan.com profile
Pro-Football-Reference.com profile

1982 births
Living people
American emigrants to Canada
American football return specialists
American football wide receivers
American players of Canadian football
Canadian Football League Most Outstanding Player Award winners
Canadian football return specialists
Canadian football wide receivers
Colorado Crush players
Hawaii Rainbow Warriors football players
Jacksonville Jaguars players
Montreal Alouettes players
Players of American football from Honolulu
Players of Canadian football from Honolulu
President Theodore Roosevelt High School alumni
Saskatchewan Roughriders players
Sportspeople from Mississauga
Toronto Argonauts players